Elleschodes is a genus of true weevils (family Curculionidae) occurring in Australia, particularly Queensland. Some species are pollinators of trees in the genus Eupomatia.

Species

The genus contains the following species:

 Elleschodes basipennis
 Elleschodes compactus
 Elleschodes ellipticus
 Elleschodes eucalypti
 Elleschodes hamiltoni
 Elleschodes hystricosus
 Elleschodes inconstans
 Elleschodes macrops
 Elleschodes modicus
 Elleschodes nigrirostris
 Elleschodes pallidus
 Elleschodes pictus
 Elleschodes placidus
 Elleschodes rufimanus
 Elleschodes rufulus
 Elleschodes scutellaris
 Elleschodes suturalis
 Elleschodes tenuirostris
 Elleschodes uniformis
 Elleschodes v-albus

References 

Curculioninae
Beetles of Australia
Taxa named by Thomas Blackburn (entomologist)